Dalmas Otieno Anyango EGH, EBS (born 19 April 1945) was born in Kenya. He was first elected as the Member of Parliament for Rongo in 1988, serving as Minister for Industrialisation from 1988 to 1991, then later that year as Minister of Labour & Human Resource Development and as Minister of Transport from 1991 to 1996. He joined the main opposition candidate in the 2007 presidential election Raila Odinga, successfully running for the Member of Parliament for Rongo. Following a violence-marred election and post-poll crisis, Odinga was appointed Prime Minister in April 2008 in a power-sharing deal with Mwai Kibaki, serving as Supervisor and Coordinator of a national unity coalition government. Dalmas was appointed as the Minister of State for Public Service. In the subsequent presidential election 5 years later he retained his seat again. In 2014 Dalmas unsuccessfully tried to create his own political outfit named Kalausi meaning whirlwind to rival the ODM party as a quest to emancipate the people of South Nyanza
This saw him break ranks with most officials and members of the ODM party from the Luo Nyanza region which eventually culminated in his loss to his nemesis Paul Abuor in the ODM primaries in 2017. He later unsuccessfully vied for Rongo MP in 2017 as independent candidate. Most political analysts view him as an independent politician who makes his own decisions without following any political tide or sycophancy. Dalmas also goes by the nickname Bade dongo and Tiga ngute bor due to his tall stature

He was educated at Strathmore School.

Mr Dalmas lost his son in 2008 after a helicopter landed on him in Canada. The son had gone to study at a university in Canada.

References

Living people
Orange Democratic Movement politicians
Members of the National Assembly (Kenya)
Alumni of Strathmore School
1945 births